Mike Brewer (born 1964) is a British presenter of motoring television programmes.

Mike Brewer also may refer to:

Mike Brewer (musician) (born 1944), American musician with duo Brewer & Shipley
Mike Brewer (baseball) (born 1959), former Major League Baseball right fielder
Mike Brewer (rugby union) (born 1964), former New Zealand rugby union footballer
Mike Brewer (ice hockey) (born 1969), Canadian ice hockey player and coach
Michael Brewer (born 1992), American football quarterback
Michael C. Brewer (born 1945), musical director of the National Youth Choirs of Great Britain